The Aerial Anarchists is a 1911 British silent science fiction film directed by Walter R. Booth. It is the third and final film in Booth's science fiction series seeking to present a picture of futuristic aerial warfare. Aerial Anarchists followed on from Aerial Torpedo and Aerial Submarine and is the first real science fiction series made in the United Kingdom. The story focuses on an attack against London by a fleet of airships from an unknown country.

Plot
There is currently no known surviving footage of this film and all information is based upon the original catalog synopsis from Kineto Film Studios. The film contains scenes of a bombing and its aftermath throughout London. Sequences such as the bombing of St. Paul's Cathedral and a railway disaster in which a train is seen to leap into a chasm, feature prominently.

Production
Airships provide the "engine of destruction" in The Aerial Anarchists. The Kineto Film Catalogue describes the film as "This thrilling and amazing film depicts with far more realism than could be conveyed by the pen of the imaginative novelist, the horrors of warfare upon society if carried on by means of the latest development of mechanics - Aviation.

The picture is a series of thrills from beginning to end, but the most extraordinary and vivid incidents are the bombardment of St. Paul's Cathedral from an Aeroplane and a Railway Accident, in which a train leaps into a chasm.

These exciting scenes are so magnificent and realistically staged that they will fill audiences with amazement and mystification."

Reception
Aviation film historian Michael Paris in From the Wright Brothers to Top Gun: Aviation, Nationalism, and Popular Cinema (1995) described the connection of The Aerial Anarchists to the novels of Jules Verne. "Clearly the paradox that while the flying machine could be a powerful agent of civilization and progress, in the wrong hands, it could also be a terrifying engine of destruction which would change the whole nature of warfare."

See also
 EOFFTV
Hartmann the Anarchist
The Airship Destroyer
The War in the Air
Invasion literature

References
Notes

Citations

Bibliography

 Lee, Walt. Reference Guide to Fantastic Films. London: Chelsea Lee Books, 1973. .
 Low, Rachael. History of British Film: 1906-1914. London: Unwin Brothers Limited, 1973. . 
 Paris, Michael. From the Wright Brothers to Top Gun: Aviation, Nationalism, and Popular Cinema. Manchester, UK: Manchester University Press, 1995. .
 Wingrove, David. Science Fiction Film Source Book''. Harlow, Essex, UK: Longman Group Limited, 1985. .

External links 
 

1911 films
1910s science fiction films
British aviation films
British black-and-white films
British science fiction films
British silent short films
Films set in London
Lost British films
Films directed by Walter R. Booth
1911 lost films
1910s British films
Silent science fiction films
Lost science fiction films